"Sorry Seems to Be the Hardest Word" is a song written by English musician Elton John and songwriter Bernie Taupin. It was recorded by Elton John and released in 1976, both as a single and as part of the Blue Moves album. It was John's second single released by The Rocket Record Company. The song is a mournful ballad about a romantic relationship which is falling apart.

The song also appeared the following year on Greatest Hits Volume II, though for copyright reasons it no longer appears on the current version of that album. It now appears on Greatest Hits 1976–1986, The Very Best of Elton John and in Greatest Hits 1970–2002, as well as a number of other compilations.

Background and composition
"Sorry Seems to Be the Hardest Word" is a mournful ballad about a romantic relationship that is falling apart. Bernie Taupin said: "It's a pretty simple idea, but one that I think everyone can relate to at one point or another in their life. That whole idealistic feeling people get when they want to save something from dying when they basically know deep down inside that it's already dead. It's that heartbreaking, sickening part of love that you wouldn't wish on anyone if you didn't know that it's inevitable that they're going to experience it one day."

Elton John began writing the song in 1975 in Los Angeles. Whilst many of his songs involved Taupin writing lyrics first, then John writing the music later, John wrote the melody and most of the lyrics for "Sorry Seems to Be the Hardest Word", and Taupin completed it afterwards. John explained: "I was sitting there and out it came, 'What have I got to do to make you love me.'"
Taupin later said: "I don't think he was intending on writing a song, but we were sitting around an apartment in Los Angeles, and he was playing around on the piano and he came up with this melody line, and I said, 'Hey, that's really nice.' For some reason this lyrical line, 'Sorry seems to be the hardest word' ran through my head, and it fit perfectly with what he was playing. So I said, 'Don't do anything more to that, let me go write something,' so I wrote it out in a few minutes and we had the song." Taupin added: "[The i]nteresting thing about 'Sorry Seems to Be the Hardest Word' is that it's one of the rare occasions when Elton played me a melody line that inspired a lyric, as opposed to our routine of the lyrics always coming first. He was messing around on the piano one day and was playing something and asked me what did I think. It was actually pretty immediate, the title and the first couple of lines came into my head in a way that I guess I felt they were already there and just needed a little prompting."

Reception
Billboard praised John's vocal performance, calling it "almost painfully sincere and believable" and also commented on the complexity of the backing vocals.  Cash Box called it "a tender love song about breaking up." Record World called it "Elton's most emotional and moving ballad performance since 'Someone Saved My Life Tonight.'"

Personnel
 Elton John – piano, vocals
 Ray Cooper – vibraphone
 Carl Fortina – accordion
 James Newton Howard – electric piano, strings arrangement
 Kenny Passarelli – bass

Commercial performance and certifications
The song was a Top 20 hit, reaching No. 11 in the United Kingdom, No. 6 in the United States and No. 3 in Canada. In addition, the song went to No. 1 on the US and Canadian Adult Contemporary charts. In the US, it was certified Gold on 25 January 1977 by the RIAA.

Chart history

Weekly charts

Year-end charts

Sales and certifications

Blue version

"Sorry Seems to Be the Hardest Word" was covered in 2002 by English boy band Blue for their second studio album, One Love (2002). The song was recorded as a collaboration with Elton John and was the second single from the album. It peaked at number one on the UK Singles Chart on 15 December 2002, giving Blue their third number-one single and John his fifth. It also reached number one in Hungary and the Netherlands, and peaked within the top 10 in an additional 16 countries.

Background
When Blue's second studio album, One Love, was being put together, executive producer Hugh Goldsmith said that a cover version should be included on the final tracklist. Band member Lee Ryan suggested "Sorry Seems to Be the Hardest Word" as it was his favourite song of all time. Despite reservations from the rest of the group, who were sceptical that Elton John would allow them to record the track, John's management gave permission. John accompanied the band in the recording studio and was originally only going to play the piano, but he later said he was willing sing as well, and the song became a duet.

Track listings
UK CD1
 "Sorry Seems to Be the Hardest Word" (radio edit) – 3:31
 "Lonely This Christmas" – 2:08
 "Sorry Seems to Be the Hardest Word" (Ruffin Ready Soul Mix) – 3:51
 Video interactive element – 3:30

UK CD2
 "Sorry Seems to Be the Hardest Word" (radio edit) – 3:31
 "Album Medley" – 5:44
 "Sweet Thing" – 3:38
 Video interactive element – 3:30

UK cassette single
 "Sorry Seems to Be the Hardest Word" (radio edit) – 3:31
 "Album Medley" – 5:44
 "Sweet Thing" – 3:38

Personnel
Personnel are taken from the UK CD1 liner notes.
 Elton John – music, featured vocals
 Bernie Taupin – lyrics
 Blue – vocals
 StarGate – production
 Max Dodson – photography

Charts

Weekly charts

Year-end charts

Decade-end charts

Certifications

Release history

Other versions
The song was covered by Joe Cocker in 1991 for the Two Rooms: Celebrating the Songs of Elton John & Bernie Taupin tribute album. Cocker is quoted in the album liner notes: 

In 1993, Argentinian singer Pedro Aznar covered and translated the lyrics in Spanish called "Ya no hay forma de pedir perdón", which made the single popular and a favourite among Argentinians.

Mary J. Blige also covered this song.

In 2004, Elton John and Ray Charles performed the song on Charles' duet album, Genius Loves Company. It would turn out to be the last recording Charles ever did before his death that June. The duet was nominated for a Grammy Award for Best Pop Collaboration with Vocals. It was also performed by smooth jazz saxophonist Kenny G on the soprano saxophone featuring Richard Marx on his 2004 album At Last...The Duets Album later that year.

The single was the lead single for the eight-track remix compilation Good Morning to the Night in collaboration with Australian remixer Pnau, which came out on 16 July 2012. In 2015, the song was covered by Diana Krall. This version was included on her Wallflower album.

References

1976 songs
1976 singles
2002 singles
1970s ballads
Blue (English band) songs
Dutch Top 40 number-one singles
Elton John songs
Innocent Records singles
MCA Records singles
Number-one singles in Scotland
Song recordings produced by Gus Dudgeon
Song recordings produced by Stargate (record producers)
Songs with lyrics by Bernie Taupin
Songs with music by Elton John
The Rocket Record Company singles
Torch songs
UK Singles Chart number-one singles
Virgin Records singles